Admiral Lord Amelius Beauclerk  (23 May 1771 – 10 December 1846) was a Royal Navy officer.

Early life
Beauclerk was born on 23 May 1771, the third son of Aubrey Beauclerk, 5th Duke of St Albans (1740–1802) and his wife, the former Lady Catherine Ponsonby (1742–1789), daughter of William Ponsonby, 2nd Earl of Bessborough.  He was baptised at St Marylebone Parish Church, London on 15 June 1771.

He was not confirmed as a Lieutenant until 21 September 1790, at the time of the Great Spanish Armament crisis.

Promotion to captain

Frigate commands
On his return to England, Lord Amelius was appointed to the frigate , of 44 guns and 251 men, and on the coast of Ireland, at the action of 13 June 1796, captured the Proserpine, of 42 guns and 348 men, after a brilliant and well-managed action, in which Dryad lost only two killed and seven wounded, while Proserpine lost thirty killed and forty-five wounded. He also captured several privateers.

Ship-of-the-line commands

Admiral
On 1 August 1811 he was promoted to rear-admiral, but during that and the two following years he continued in the North Sea, stretching in 1813 as far as the North Cape in command of a small squadron on the look-out for the American Commodore Rogers. In 1814 he commanded in the Basque Roads, and conducted the negotiations for the local suspension of hostilities. On 12 August 1819 he was advanced to vice-admiral, and from 1824 to 1827 was Commander-in-Chief at Lisbon and on the coast of Portugal. He became a full admiral on 22 July 1830, and was Commander-in-Chief, Plymouth from 1836 to 1839.

Beauclerk was a fine professional officer who benefited from his family connections to secure early promotion. Port Beauclerc, Point Amelius, Point St. Albans, Beauclerc Island, Beauclerc Peak and Amelius Island, all in Alaska, are named for him.

He died, unmarried, at his seat, Winchfield House, near Farnborough, Hampshire, on 10 December 1846.

Honours and achievements
Beauclerk became a Fellow of the Royal Society in 1809, and was given the honorary rank of Colonel of Marines on 31 July 1810. He was appointed to the KCB on 2 January 1815, GCH on 29 March 1831, GCB on 4 August 1835, and First and Principal Naval Aide-de-Camp to King William IV on 4 August 1839. He was also the hereditary Lord of the Manor of Winchfield, Hampshire.

See also

References

 

Attribution

|-

Royal Navy personnel of the Napoleonic Wars
Fellows of the Royal Society
Knights Grand Cross of the Order of the Bath
Royal Navy admirals
Younger sons of dukes
1771 births
1846 deaths
Amelius